Sugar Island of Ottawa County, Ohio, United States in southwestern Lake Erie. It is a private island and one of the smaller of the island group at 0.123 km² (30.39 acres). It lies just off the northwest shore of Middle Bass Island. It is located in Put-in-Bay Township, Ottawa County, Ohio.

Sugar Island was once part of Middle Bass Island, connected by way of a short isthmus.  As trees were lumbered from this strip of connecting land, Lake Erie began to reclaim the newly exposed, loose soil.  Thus, the connecting isthmus sank into the lake, leaving Sugar Island separate from Middle Bass Island.

References
Sugar Island: Blocks 1073 and 1074, Census Tract 501, Ottawa County, Ohio United States Census Bureau

Islands of Ottawa County, Ohio
Islands of Lake Erie in Ohio
Private islands of Ohio
Private islands of the Great Lakes